is a Japanese voice actress. She records voices for both male and female characters in animation films. She is affiliated with Office Anemone, formerly affiliated with Aoni Production until December 2010. She made her career debut in 2007, by voicing Torimaki in the animation film Shugo Chara!.

She is from Yubari, Hokkaido.

Notable roles
2007
Shugo Chara! (Torimaki, a female student)
2008
Hoshi Shin Ichi Shortcut, a literary program broadcast on NHK TV (as Hanako, a boy and others)
Lilpri: Yubipuruhimechen!, Ringo Yukimori
2011
Tales of the World: Radiant Mythology 3, Heroes Voice
Vocaloid 3 (Yuzuki Yukari)
Voiceroid+ (Yuzuki Yukari)
2013
Girl Friend Beta, Saika Maeda
2014
 Idolrhythm, Suzuka Osaragi
 Danganronpa Another Episode: Ultra Despair Girls, Hiroko Hagakure
2015
 Ukiyo no shishi, Ukiyo no rōshi, Otose
 Venus11 Vivid!, Rei Raido, Mei Hiiragi
 Puyopuyo!! Quest Chiquita, Succubus, Elma
2016
 Advent Girl, Chōkō
 Ensemble Girls!, Kasumi Mikage
Granblue Fantasy, Arie
 Shinobi Nightmare, Tamayori
 Yamato Chronicle Sōsei, Amenōzume
2017
 Granado Espada, Eileen, Lubiana
2018
 Sdorica, Nolva
2019
 Da Capo 4, Izumi Togawa
 Dairoku Ryōhei
 Merry Garland, Defravka

References

External links
Official agency profile 

Living people
Japanese video game actresses
Japanese voice actresses
Voice actresses from Hokkaido
21st-century Japanese actresses
Year of birth missing (living people)